Salvador Cosío Gaona (born 26 January 1961) is a Mexican politician from the Partido Revolucionario Institucional. From 2000 to 2003 he served as Deputy of the LVIII Legislature of the Mexican Congress representing Jalisco.

References

1961 births
Living people
Politicians from Guadalajara, Jalisco
Institutional Revolutionary Party politicians
21st-century Mexican politicians
Deputies of the LVIII Legislature of Mexico
Members of the Chamber of Deputies (Mexico) for Jalisco